The French Academy in Rome is an Academy located in the Villa Medici, within the Villa Borghese, on the Pincio (Pincian Hill) in Rome, Italy.

History

The Academy was founded at the Palazzo Capranica in 1666 by Louis XIV under the direction of Jean-Baptiste Colbert, Charles Le Brun and Gian Lorenzo Bernini. The Academy was from the 17th to 19th centuries the culmination of study for select French artists who, having won the prestigious Prix de Rome (Rome Prize), were honored with a 3, 4 or 5-year scholarship (depending on the art discipline they followed) in the Eternal City for the purpose of the study of art and architecture.  Such scholars were and are known as pensionnaires de l'Académie (Academy pensioners). One recipient of the scholarship in the 17th century was Pierre Le Gros the Younger.

The Academy was housed in the Palazzo Capranica until 1737, and then in the Palazzo Mancini from 1737 to 1793. In 1803 Napoleon Bonaparte moved it to the Villa Medici, with the intention of perpetuating an institution once threatened by the French Revolution and, thus, of retaining for young French artists the opportunity to see and copy the masterpieces of the Antiquity or the Renaissance and send back to Paris their "envois de Rome", the results of  the inspiration they had gained in Rome. These "envois" were annual works, sent to Paris to be judged, and were a compulsory requirement for all the pensionaries.

At first, the villa and its gardens were in a sad state and had to be renovated to house the winners of the Prix de Rome. The competition was interrupted during the first World War, and Mussolini confiscated the villa in 1941, forcing the academy of France in Rome to withdraw to Nice then to Fontainebleau until 1945. The competition and Prix de Rome were eliminated in 1968 by André Malraux (the last Grand Prix for architecture came to an end as early as 1967, the events of 1968 preventing its continuation). The Académie des Beaux-Arts in Paris and the Institut de France then lost their guardianship of the Villa Medici to the Ministry of the Culture and the State. From that time on, the boarders no longer belonged solely to the traditional disciplines (painting, sculpture, architecture, medal-engraving, precious-stone engraving, musical composition) but also to new or previously neglected artistic fields (art history, archaeology, literature, stagecraft, photography, movies, video, restoration, writing and even cookery). These artists-in-residence are known as pensionnaires. The French word ‘pension’ refers to the room & board these, generally young and promising, artists receive. The artists are no longer recruited by a competition but by application, and their stays vary from six to eighteen months and even, more rarely, two years.

Between 1961 and 1967, the artist Balthus, then at the head of the Academy, carried out a vast restoration campaign of the palace and its gardens, providing them with modern equipment. Balthus participated "hands on" in all the phases of the construction. Where the historic décor had disappeared, Balthus proposed personal alternatives. He invented a décor that was a homage to the past and, at the same time,  radically contemporary: The mysterious melancholic decor he created for Villa Medici has become, in turn, historic and was undergoing an important restoration campaign in 2016. Work continued under the direction of director, Richard Peduzzi, and the Villa Medici resumed organizing exhibitions and shows created by its artists in residence.

Under director Frédéric Mitterrand the Academy opened up its guest rooms to the general public at times when they are not used by pensionnaires or other official guests.

List of directors

Many famous artists have been director of the Academy:
 1666-1672: Charles Errard
 1673-1675: Noël Coypel
 1675-1684: Charles Errard
 1684-1699: Matthieu de La Teullière
 1699-1704: René-Antoine Houasse
 1704-1725: Charles-François Poerson
 1725-1737: Nicolas Vleughels
 1737-1738: Pierre de L'Estache
 1738-1751: Jean-François de Troy
 1751-1775: Charles-Joseph Natoire
 1775         : Noël Hallé
 1775-1781: Joseph-Marie Vien
 1781-1787: Louis Jean François Lagrenée
 1787-1792: François-Guillaume Ménageot
 1792-1807: Joseph-Benoît Suvée
 1807         : Pierre-Adrien Pâris
 1807-1816: Guillaume Guillon Lethière
 1816-1823: Charles Thévenin
 1823-1828: Pierre-Narcisse Guérin
 1829-1834: Horace Vernet
 1835-1840: Jean-Auguste-Dominique Ingres
 1841-1846: Jean-Victor Schnetz
 1847-1852: Jean Alaux
 1853-1866: Jean-Victor Schnetz
 1866-1867: Joseph-Nicolas Robert-Fleury
 1867-1873: Ernest Hébert
 1873-1878: Jules Eugène Lenepveu
 1879-1884: Louis-Nicolas Cabat
 1885-1890: Ernest Hébert
 1891-1904: Jean-Baptiste-Claude-Eugène Guillaume
 1905-1910: Charles-Emile-Auguste Durand, a.k.a. Carolus-Duran
 1913-1921: Albert Besnard
 1921-1933: Denys Puech
 1933-1937: Paul-Maximilien Landowski
 1937-1960: Jacques Ibert
 1961-1977: Comte Balthazar Klossowski de Rola, a.k.a. Balthus
 1979-1985: Jean Leymarie
 1985-1994: Jean-Marie Drot
 1994-1997: Pierre-Jean Angremy, a.k.a. Pierre-Jean Rémy
 1997-2002: Bruno Racine
 2002-2008: Richard Peduzzi
 2008-2009: Frédéric Mitterrand
 2009–2015: Eric de Chassey
 2015–2018: Muriel Mayette-Holtz
 2020–present: Sam Stourdzé

See also

 American Academy in Rome
 Villa Massimo

Notes

External links

 Google Map

Art schools in Italy
French art
Foreign academies in Rome
1666 establishments in the Papal States